Thornville may refer to:

 Thornville, KwaZulu-Natal, a town in South Africa
 Thornville, Michigan, an unincorporated community in the United States
 Thornville, North Yorkshire, a civil parish in England
 Thornville, Ohio, a village in the United States
 Thornville, Queensland, a locality in the Toowoomba Region, Australia